The Astana Challenger Capital Cup is a professional tennis tournament played on indoor hard courts. It is part of the Association of Tennis Professionals (ATP) Challenger Tour. It has been held in Astana, Kazakhstan in 2016.

Past finals

Singles

Doubles

References

ATP Challenger Tour
Hard court tennis tournaments
Tennis tournaments in Kazakhstan